Olga Mutanda (born 3 April 1967) is an Ivorian sprinter. She competed in the women's 200 metres at the 1992 Summer Olympics.

References

1967 births
Living people
Athletes (track and field) at the 1992 Summer Olympics
Ivorian female sprinters
Olympic athletes of Ivory Coast
Place of birth missing (living people)
Olympic female sprinters